Devastator Peak, also known as The Devastator, is the lowest and southernmost of the six subsidiary peaks that form the Mount Meager massif in southwestern British Columbia, Canada.

Geology
Devastator Peak is a dissected andesitic volcanic plug, which was part of a larger structure of Mount Meager, but parts eroded away, leaving Devastator Peak. Like the rest of the Mount Meager massif, it is part of the Garibaldi Volcanic Belt which is a segment of the Cascade Volcanic Arc, but it is not within the geographic boundary of the Cascade Range.

Devastator Peak was the source for a thick sequence of andesite lava flows that occurred 0.5-1.0 million years ago. Erosional remnants of these flows form the stratified crags of Pylon Peak. The slopes of the peak are highly unstable, consisting of weak, hydrothermally altered felsic rocks. There have been many recent debris flows which have flowed down into the Meager Creek drainage.

See also
List of volcanoes in Canada
Garibaldi Volcanic Belt
Cascade Volcanoes
Volcanism in Canada

References

Volcanic plugs of British Columbia
Two-thousanders of British Columbia
Subduction volcanoes
Mount Meager massif
Pliocene volcanoes
Pleistocene volcanoes